Jim Richmond (13 October 1932 – 2 November 2019) was a Scottish footballer who played for Hamilton Academical, Falkirk, Kilmarnock, St Johnstone,  and Lossiemouth. While at Kilmarnock Richmond played in the 1960 Scottish Cup Final as well as the 1960 and 1962 Scottish League Cup Finals, and was voted the Kilmarnock Supporters Association’s Player of the Year in 1962. He also represented the Scottish Football League XI in a victory over the League of Ireland. After moving to Highland League side Lossiemouth as a player, Richmond later became their manager and settled in the area for the rest of his life.

References

1932 births
2019 deaths
Scottish footballers
Falkirk F.C. players
Kilmarnock F.C. players
St Johnstone F.C. players
Hamilton Academical F.C. players
Scottish Football League players
Association football fullbacks
Scottish Football League representative players